Frequency is an American mystery science fiction drama television series that aired on The CW from October 5, 2016 to January 25, 2017. Inspired by the 2000 film Frequency, the television series was developed by Jeremy Carver. The series was canceled on May 8, 2017; five days later, an epilogue to the series was released.

Premise
In 2016, NYPD Detective Raimy Sullivan discovers that she is able to speak to her deceased father Frank Sullivan in 1996 via his old ham radio. Her attempts to save his life trigger the "butterfly effect", changing the present in unforeseen ways. To fix the damage, she must work with her father across time to solve a decades-old murder case.

Cast and characters

Main
 Peyton List as Raimy Elizabeth Sullivan
 Ada Breker as young Raimy 
An NYPD detective who experiences an unusual weather phenomenon that allows her to communicate with her late father through radio transmissions. Born and raised in Queens, Raimy is stationed at the 21st Precinct (the same precinct her father worked out of in 1996) and has been since the start of her career in 2008. She achieved the rank of detective in 2014. After changing the timeline by conversing with her father, Raimy seems to be the only one who notices the changes. Now, she and Frank work across time to solve the Nightingale murders before her mother can become the killer's next victim.
 Riley Smith as Francis Joseph "Frank" Sullivan: Raimy's father and an NYPD detective in 1996. He was originally killed while working undercover and posthumously accused of being corrupt, but survived when Raimy changed the timeline by warning him of his impending death. In the new timeline caused by his survival in 1996, Frank saw his daughter grow up and graduate from the police academy, and even served as her training officer in 2008. He dies in a car crash in 2011.
 Devin Kelley as Julie Elizabeth Sullivan: Raimy's mother and Frank's widow who, once the timeline is changed so that her husband survives, is killed by the Nightingale.
 Mekhi Phifer as Detective (1996)/Lieutenant (2016) Satch Reyna: Frank's partner who now runs the 21st Precinct's Detective Squad where Raimy works. He and Stan Moreno were patrol officers in the late 1980s. In the original timeline, Satch's marriage collapsed in the intervening 20 years, and he became estranged from his children.
 Anthony Ruivivar as Captain Stan Moreno: The 21st Precinct Commander who, as a narcotics detective in 1996, was responsible for the undercover operation that resulted in Frank's death. In the original timeline, then-Sergeant Moreno, already a legendary narcotics detective, served as Raimy's training officer in 2008. Frank and Raimy believe he is corrupt.
 Lenny Jacobson as Gordo: Raimy's childhood friend.
 Daniel Bonjour as Daniel Lawrence: Raimy's fiancé in 2016. When Raimy alters the timeline to save her father, she is horrified to discover that she and Daniel have never met and he is dating another woman. Nevertheless, she retains memories of their previous romance. When the timeline is again altered, their engagement is restored by the end of the series.

Recurring
 Sandy Robson as Mike Rainey
 Brad Kelly as "Little Jay" Garza
 Alexandra Metz as Maya Gowan
 Michael Charles Roman as Thomas Goff: A suspect in the Nightingale murders.
 David Lipper as Robbie Womack
 Melinda Page Hamilton as Marilyn Goff
 Britt McKillip as young Meghan
 Kenneth Mitchell as Deacon Joe Hurley: A suspect in the Nightingale murders.
 Rob Mayes as Detective Kyle Moseby: A fellow NYPD detective who in the changed timeline has a sexual relationship with Raimy.

Episodes

On May 13, 2017, The CW released an epilogue to the series to provide closure after its cancellation.

Broadcast
Netflix acquired the exclusive broadcast rights to Frequency in the United Kingdom, Ireland, India, Canada and Oceania, adding new episodes to its platform less than a day after their original U.S. broadcast.

Reception

Critical response
Frequency has received generally positive reviews from critics. Review aggregator Rotten Tomatoes gives the series a score of 75% based on 24 reviews. The consensus says, "Frequency confusing timeline and somewhat familiar dramatic framework are offset by solid acting and an intriguingly loaded premise." On Metacritic, the show has a weighted average of 64/100 based on 21 reviews, indicating "generally favorable reviews".

Ratings

See also
Signal, South Korea / TVN, 2016
Ditto (2000 film)

References

External links
 
 
 
 

2016 American television series debuts
2017 American television series endings
The CW original programming
2010s American drama television series
2010s American mystery television series
2010s American science fiction television series
Fictional portrayals of the New York City Police Department
Live action television shows based on films
Television series by Warner Bros. Television Studios
Television shows filmed in Vancouver
Television series set in 1996
Television series set in 2016
Television shows set in New York City
2010s American time travel television series